is a private junior college in Yokkaichi, Mie, Japan. Founded as a school for clothing in 1939, it was established as a junior college on October 31, 2016.

References

External links
 Official website 

Japanese junior colleges
Educational institutions established in 2016
Private universities and colleges in Japan
Universities and colleges in Mie Prefecture
2016 establishments in Japan
Yokkaichi